Hanksville is a small town in Wayne County, Utah, United States, at the junction of State Routes 24 and 95. The population was 219 at the 2010 census.

Situated in the Colorado Plateau's cold desert ecological region, the town is just south of the confluence of the Fremont River and Muddy Creek, which together form the Dirty Devil River, which then flows southeast to the Colorado River. The Bureau of Land Management's Henry Mountains field station is located in Hanksville.

History

The town was settled in 1882 and known for a time for the name given to the surrounding area, Graves Valley. It took the name of Hanksville in 1885, after Ebenezer Hanks, an early settler. It was not incorporated until January 6, 1999.

The REA brought electricity to the community in 1960. Today agriculture, mining, and tourism are the main drivers to the local economy. Tourism is particularly important with people coming for recreation at Lake Powell, Capitol Reef National Park, the Henry Mountains, the San Rafael Swell, Goblin Valley State Park, and the solitude of the surrounding deserts and slot canyons.

Hanksville was a supply post for Butch Cassidy and the Wild Bunch, who would hide out at Robbers Roost in the desert southeast of town.

During the uranium mining frenzy following World War II, Hanksville became a supply center for the prospectors and miners scouring the deserts of the Colorado Plateau. Many abandoned mines can be found in the deserts surrounding the town.

Demographics

As of the 2010 census, 219 people lived in the town. There were 94 housing units. The racial makeup of the town was 98.2% White, 0.5% Asian, and 1.4% from two or more races. Hispanic or Latino of any race were 0.9% of the population.

Climate
According to the Köppen climate classification system, Hanksville has a semi-arid climate, abbreviated "BSk" on climate maps.

See also
 
 List of cities and towns in Utah

References

External links

 

Towns in Utah
Towns in Wayne County, Utah
Populated places established in 1882
1882 establishments in Utah Territory